The Hollow Crown is a series of British television film adaptations of William Shakespeare's history plays.

The first series is an adaptation of Shakespeare's second historical tetralogy, the Henriad: Richard II, Henry IV, Part 1, Henry IV, Part 2 and Henry V, starring Ben Whishaw, Jeremy Irons and Tom Hiddleston. Olivier Award winners Rupert Goold, Richard Eyre and Thea Sharrock directed the telefilms, which were produced by Rupert Ryle-Hodges for BBC Two and executive produced by Sam Mendes and Pippa Harris under Neal Street Productions in association with NBCUniversal. The first series, which aired in the United Kingdom in 2012, received positive reviews from critics. Ben Whishaw and Simon Russell Beale won British Academy Television Awards for Leading actor and Supporting actor for their performances as Richard II and Falstaff, and Jeremy Irons was nominated for a Screen Actors Guild Award for Best Actor for his role as Henry IV. The first episode, Richard II, was nominated for the Best Single Drama at the BAFTAs.

The BBC aired the concluding series in 2016 as The Hollow Crown: The Wars of the Roses, a reference to the series of English civil wars known as the Wars of the Roses, starring Benedict Cumberbatch, Hugh Bonneville, Judi Dench, Sophie Okonedo and Tom Sturridge. The plays were produced in 2015 by the same team that made the first series of films but were directed by the former artistic director of Royal Court Theatre and Olivier Award winner, Dominic Cooke. They are based on Shakespeare's first tetralogy: Henry VI, Part 1, Henry VI, Part 2, Henry VI, Part 3 and Richard III. The adaptation presents Henry VI in two parts, incorporating all three Henry VI plays. Benedict Cumberbatch was nominated for the BAFTA Television Award for Best Leading Actor and The Wars of the Roses was nominated for Best Mini-Series.

The title of the series is taken from a line in Richard II:

Cast 
List indicators:
 A dark grey cell indicates the character was not in the film.
 Italics indicates a non-speaking cameo

Episodes

Series 1 (2012)

Series 2 (2016)

Production

The BBC scheduled the screening of Shakespeare's history plays as part of the 2012 Cultural Olympiad, a celebration of British culture coinciding with the 2012 Summer Olympics. Sam Mendes signed up as executive producer to adapt all four plays in September 2010. He is joined as executive producer by Pippa Harris (both representing Neal Street Productions), Rupert Ryle-Hodges as producer, Gareth Neame (NBCUniversal), and Ben Stephenson (BBC).

Parts of the series were filmed in Kent at Squerryes Court and Penshurst Place.

The concluding series of plays were produced in 2015 by the same team that made the first series and were directed by Dominic Cooke. Richard III was played by Benedict Cumberbatch. Executive producer Pippa Harris stated, "The critical and audience reaction to The Hollow Crown series set the bar high for Shakespeare on screen, and Neal Street (Productions) is delighted to be making the concluding part of this great history cycle. By filming the ‘Henry VI’ plays as well as ‘Richard III,’ we will allow viewers to fully appreciate how such a monstrous tyrant could find his way to power, bringing even more weight and depth to this iconic character." The production returned to Kent for The Wars of the Roses, filming at Dover Castle, Leeds Castle and Penshurst Place.

Faithfulness of adaptation 
The first series is largely faithful to the plays, although  the text is abridged and lines are occasionally cut. The second series notably compresses the three-part Henry VI into two episodes. Significant scenes involving Talbot and Joan of Arc are cut and Jack Cade's Rebellion is not included. Additionally, many elements from the Suffolk part are incorporated into the character of Somerset. While the text does not directly specify which Duke of Exeter is depicted in Henry VI, Part 3, it is widely assumed to be Henry Holland, 3rd Duke of Exeter given the play's setting between 1445 and 1471. However, the portrayal by Anton Lesser implies that it is the same person as Lesser's Thomas Beaufort from Henry V and Henry VI, Part 1, who had died in 1426 in reality.

Broadcast
The first four plays aired on consecutive Saturday evenings on BBC Two between 30 June and 21 July 2012. The start time of Henry IV, Part 1 on 7 July was delayed by an hour because of coverage of the 2012 Wimbledon Championships, and the play was shown a second time the following evening on BBC Four. The plays were shown in the United States from 20 September to 11 October 2013 as part of the PBS Great Performances series.

All four plays were shown again on consecutive evenings on BBC Four in April 2016 as part of the BBC Shakespeare Festival commemorating the 400th anniversary of the playwright's death. The second series of plays aired on consecutive Saturday evenings on BBC Two commencing Saturday 7 May 2016.

Home media
The overseas and DVD rights for The Hollow Crown series are owned by NBC Universal. A Region 2 DVD set of the four films was released on 1 October 2012. A Region 1 DVD set was released on 17 September 2013. A 2-disc DVD set of The Wars of the Roses was released on 20 June 2016.

The original music soundtrack from The Hollow Crown: The Wars of the Roses composed by Dan Jones was released on the Wave Theory Records label in June 2016 and performed by the BBC National Orchestra of Wales.

Reception and accolades
Mike Hughes of The Salinas Californian wrote, "Amazing TV – perfectly filmed."

Series 1

Series 2

References

External links
 
 
 The Hollow Crown – Extras
 The Hollow Crown: The Wars of the Roses - About the Series
 The Hollow Crown: Shakespeare’s History Plays - About the Series

2012 British television series debuts
2016 British television series endings
BBC television royalty dramas
Cultural depictions of English monarchs
Henry VI of England
Monarchy in fiction
Television series by All3Media
Television series by Universal Television
Television series set in the 14th century
Television series set in the 15th century
 
Wars of the Roses in fiction